Stephen Kendrick (born June 10, 1974) is an American film writer and producer, co-writer of the book The Love Dare with brother Alex Kendrick, and former senior associate pastor at Sherwood Baptist Church in Albany, Georgia.  Stephen, Shannon and Alex Kendrick comprise Kendrick Brothers Productions.

Filmography

References

External links 
 Kendrick Brothers Productions
 
 
 Sherwood Pictures
 Interview with Alex and Stephen Kendrick at ChristianCinema.com

Living people
Baptist ministers from the United States
American male screenwriters
American film producers
Sherwood Pictures
People from Albany, Georgia
Screenwriters from Georgia (U.S. state)
1954 births